Ditz (often stylised DITZ) is an English rock band that formed in Brighton in 2016. The band consists of Cal Francis (vocals), Caleb Remnant (bass), Anton Mocock (Guitar), Jack Looker (Guitar), Sam Evans (Drums).

Background 
The band formed in 2016 in Brighton, with the members being involved in the various music scenes in the city. The original founders, Cal Francis, and Caleb Remnant grew up together in Gloucestershire, and had tried to form bands with limited success. Later that year, Anton Mocock joined the band, followed by then drummer, Jack Looker, who joined Ditz in early 2017, with Sam Evans finalising the line up in early 2019. 

In 2020, the band released their EP, 5 Songs, which included a collection of singles previously released in 2018 to 2019. Around this time, the band signed on to Alcopop! Records. In 2022, they released their debut studio album, The Great Regression, which was met to critical acclaim.

Style 
The band has been compared to Idles, Yak, and Daughters.

Discography

Studio albums 
 The Great Regression (2022)

Extended plays 
 EP1 (2016)
 5 Songs (2020)

Singles 
 "Seeking Arrangement" (2018)
 "Gayboy" (2019)
 "Total 90" (2019)
 "Role Model" (2020)
 "Fuck the Pain Away" (2020)
 "Ded Würst" (2021)
 "The Warden" (2021)
 "I Am Kate Moss" (2022)

References

External links 
 Official website
 

English punk rock groups
English post-punk music groups
British hardcore punk groups
Musical groups from Brighton and Hove
Musical groups established in 2016
2016 establishments in England
Alcopop! Records artists
Musical quintets